Sibyl Vane may refer to:

Sibyl Vane, a main character of Oscar Wilde's novel The Picture of Dorian Gray
Sibyl Vane, a main character in Vladimir Nabokov's short story, "The Vane Sisters"
 Sibyl Vane (band), an indie rock band from Pau, France
 Sibyl Vane, an indie alternative rock band from Pärnu, Estonia